Gunin Hazarika is an Asom Gana Parishad politician from Assam, India. He was elected in Assam Legislative Assembly election in 1986, 1996 and 2001 from Kaliabor constituency.

References

Asom Gana Parishad politicians
Assam MLAs 1985–1991
Assam MLAs 1996–2001
Assam MLAs 2001–2006
People from Dhubri district
Living people
Year of birth missing (living people)